The 2015 Canoe Sprint European Championships was the 27th edition of the Canoe Sprint European Championships, an international canoe and kayak sprint event organised by the European Canoe Association, held in Račice, Czech Republic, between 1 and 3 May 2015.

Medal table
 Host nation

Medal overview

Men

Women

Paracanoe

Medal events
 Non-Paralympic classes

Medal table

External links
Official Website
Results

Canoe Sprint European Championships
Canoe Sprint European Championships
European Sprint Championships
International sports competitions hosted by the Czech Republic
Litoměřice District
Canoeing and kayaking competitions in the Czech Republic